is a Japanese former sports shooter. He competed at the 1964 Summer Olympics and the 1968 Summer Olympics. He also competed at the 1966 Asian Games and won four gold medals in team events.

References

1937 births
Living people
Japanese male sport shooters
Olympic shooters of Japan
Shooters at the 1964 Summer Olympics
Shooters at the 1968 Summer Olympics
Sportspeople from Yamaguchi Prefecture
Asian Games medalists in shooting
Shooters at the 1966 Asian Games
Asian Games gold medalists for Japan
Medalists at the 1966 Asian Games
20th-century Japanese people